Aditya Birla Intermediate College, established in 1963, is a coed Hindi medium school in Renukoot, Uttar Pradesh, India. It is affiliated to Uttar Pradesh Madhyamik Shiksha Parishad(U.P Board), Allahabad. It was established by Hindalco Industries.

The college imparts education to class sixth to twelfth (10 + 2). It offers three streams, science, humanities and commerce. The syllabus is decided by the board.

Formerly, it was named Hindalco Higher Secondary School, which was changed to Hindalco Intermediate College and then to Aditya Birla Intermediate College.

References

External links 
 Official website

High schools and secondary schools in Uttar Pradesh
Intermediate colleges in Uttar Pradesh
Buildings and structures in Sonbhadra district
Educational institutions established in 1963
1963 establishments in Uttar Pradesh
Renukoot
Education in Sonbhadra district